Granada Atlético Club de Fútbol was a Spanish football team based in Granada, in the autonomous community of Andalusia. Founded in 2004, it played its last season in Tercera División - Group 9, holding home games at Estadio Nuevo Los Cármenes, with a capacity of 16,200 seats.

History
Granada Atlético was founded in 1969 as Guadix Club de Fútbol. In 2004, it moved to Granada and was renamed Granada Atlético Club de Fútbol, starting competing in the fourth division on the next season. At the same time, a club from Íllora moved to Guadix and was renamed Guadix Club Deportivo,  and later Guadix CF.

In early August 2010, when it seemed that Atlético would be absorbed by Granada CF and become its reserve team, the negotiations were broken, and the club announced its liquidation.

Season to season

4 seasons in Tercera División

References

External links
Official website 

Association football clubs established in 2004
Association football clubs disestablished in 2009
Defunct football clubs in Andalusia
Sport in Granada
2004 establishments in Spain
2009 disestablishments in Spain